This is a list of territorial elections in Northwest Territories, Canada since 1870. The Northwest Territories operates on a consensus government using the First Past the Post electoral system. The territory does not presently recognize political parties.

Voting and consensus government

Northwest Territories elects members to the Legislative Assembly of the Northwest Territories under a non-partisan system known as consensus government. The election only decides who represents each district. The newly elected members of the assembly convene after the election to vote amongst themselves to decide which members become part of the Executive Council.
This system of government has evolved in the Northwest Territories since 1870.

The voting method to elect members is the First Past the Post electoral system. Voters under this system pick the top candidate by the number of votes cast regardless of the percent of votes earned by a candidate. With a few historical exceptions all electoral districts in the Northwest Territories are represented by a single member. First Past the Post has been used since the first election in 1881. Elections NWT is the independent regulatory body in charge of overseeing elections.

History of elections

The Northwest Territories has been through a number of distinct changes in how the territory is governed and how government has been selected.  These changes have coincided with several major boundary changes since the Government of Canada acquired the territory in 1870. From 1870 to 1876 the North-West Territories was run by an interim government, first led by lieutenant-governor William McDougall, and a council appointed by Ottawa. This council was governed under the Temporary Government of Rupert's Land Act, 1869 and the Manitoba Act, 1870 The council itself sat in Manitoba and was made up of Members of the Manitoba Legislative Assembly.

In 1876 the Temporary Council was dissolved and a new council was appointed under the North-West Territories Act. Members could be elected to join the council if an area of  had 1,000 inhabitants. The first such electoral districts were created in 1881. According to the Act, when the council reached twenty members, it would gain control of territorial affairs from the crown. The Council achieved this requirement in 1886. The council was renamed to an assembly and was dissolved in 1888. Twelve elections to rotate and elect members to new districts were held during the period between 1876 and 1888.

Five general elections would occur between 1888 and 1905, as the territories underwent significant growth. In 1897 after an amendment to the North-West Territories Act, the territories experienced a short-lived period of partisan politics that led to the North-West Territories Liberal-Conservative Party being elected in the fourth and fifth elections until 1905. The government in this period was made of members from the populated regions in the south. No members from the Arctic region would sit in government until 1947. In 1905, Alberta and Saskatchewan were carved out of the North-West Territories. As a result, the population dropped from approx 160,000 to 17,000, of which 16,000 were aboriginal and had no right to vote under Canadian law. The government of the North-West Territories defaulted back to its 1870 constitutional status, and once again came under federal control. This period of the second council, which governed from Ottawa, lasted from 1905 to 1951.

In 1951, the second council was dissolved in order to return to elections. Rather than being fully elected body, the Councils and Assemblies were a mix of elected and appointed members. After 1975 the Assembly became fully elected. In 1999 the Northwest Territories underwent one last division as the territory of Nunavut was created out of the eastern half of the territory.

The boundary changes have resulted in a disconnect in four periods of the territorial government. The records of the temporary council falls under the archives of the Manitoba government, while the archives and electoral records of the period of government from 1876 to 1905 were retained by the Saskatchewan government. The archives of the council from 1905 to 1951 are under the Canadian Government who appointed the council from that period.

List of elections

See also
List of Alberta general elections
List of Saskatchewan general elections
List of Nunavut general elections
List of Yukon general elections
List of Northwest Territories Plebiscites

Notes

References

External links
Government of Northwest Territories
Elections Northwest Territories
Northwest Territories Elections Act
Councils and Assemblies of the Northwest Territories dates and photos from 1951 to present
Personnel of Northwest Territories Assembly 1888 - 1905

Northwest Territories general elections
Elections, general